The Order of Berthold the First was a dynastic order in the Grand Duchy of Baden. It was established on 29 April 1877 by Frederick I, Grand Duke of Baden to mark the twenty-fifth anniversary of his accession as an additional class above the grand cross of the Order of the Zähringer Lion. On his seventieth birthday Frederick I separated it from that order and gave it statutes as an order in its own right. After that date, the order could be given to all persons for faithful service or as a special show of recognition and benevolence.

Classes
Originally awarded in only one class, in 1896 it was expanded to three classes:
Grand Cross
Grand Commander (1st Class) and Commander (2nd Class)
Knight
Two crossed swords were added if the award was for military service.

Insignia

Badge
The badge is a gold white-cut Maltese cross with gold spheres at the tips and medieval ducal crowns in the angles. At the centre is a red enamel circle with a gold border and a crowned gold monogram. The suspension ring is attached to a grand ducal crown.

Star
This is eight beamed and gold or four beamed and silver, depending on the class. It has a central round panel showing Berthold IV, Duke of Zähringen on horseback, based on his 1177 seal for the Stift am Grossmünster in Zurich, which was mistaken in 1877 for Berthold I (c. 1000–1078), Duke of Carinthia. The central panel is surrounded by "GERECHTIGKEIT IST MACHT" (Justice is Power) in medieval style lettering.

The eight-point-star badge for recipients of the Grand Cross was worn on the left breast, using a shoulder sash worn from the left shoulder to the right hip. Commanders 1st class wear the cross of the order at their collar, commanders 2nd class wear a four-beamed silver star on the left breast and knights a cross on the left breast. In special cases the grand cross could also be awarded with a golden chain. The ribbon of the order was red with narrow gold stripes down each side.

Awards 
Excludes awards to foreign sovereigns and to members of the grand ducal house of Baden.

Bibliography 
  Arnhard Graf Klenau: Orden in Deutschland und Österreich. Band II: Deutsche Staaten (1806–1918). Teil I: Anhalt–Hannover. Offenbach 2008. . S. 54–57.
  Lars Adler, Franz Hannesschläger: Der badische Orden Berthold des Ersten von Zähringen. Die Stiftung des letzten Verdienstordens im Großherzogtum Baden. in: OuE-Magazin. Deutsche Gesellschaft für Ordenskunde. 12. Jahrgang. Heft 68. (August 2010) S. 194–203.
  Hennig Volle: Badens Orden. Freiburg im Breisgau 1976. S. 46ff.

References 

Orders, decorations, and medals of Baden
Grand Duchy of Baden
Awards established in 1877
1877 establishments in Germany